Vaniusha and The Space Pirate is a 1991 Soviet Russian stop-motion animation film by Vladimir Danilevich. This film was produced by Soyuzmultfilm studio. The film is about The Friendly Newcomer from another planet. The film is The Third Film of the tetralogy, which tells about the adventures of The Newcomer Vaniusha and his friends. Other three films called The Newcomer in The Cabbage, Vaniusha The Newcomer and Vaniusha and The Giant.

Plot summary
The Alien Prince arrives on Earth, He asks for help Vanyusha. The Space Pirate kidnapped The Alien Princess. Vanyusha with His friends help The Alien Prince and save The Princess.

In The Plot of This Film are mixed The Elements of The Folk Tales and The Science Fiction Stories.

Creators

See also
"The Newcomer in The Cabbage"
"Vaniusha The Newcomer" 
"Vaniusha and The Giant"

External links
Vaniusha and The Space Pirate at Animator.ru
The Film at The Russian Movie base (rus) at Kinopoisk.ru

1991 animated films
1991 films
Russian animated films
Soyuzmultfilm
Soviet animated films
Russian and Soviet animated science fiction films